Bridgtown is a residential and industrial area, and civil parish, in the Cannock Chase District of Staffordshire, England. It is situated on the A5 between Cannock and Great Wyrley. There are multiple industrial and retail estates in and around the village, as well as residential areas.

The parish council describe Bridgtown as either a village or an area. There is now only one church in Bridgtown, the Bethel Church. There was one on Church Street but it is now used for commercial purposes.

The Chase Line railway from Rugeley to Walsall passes the south of Bridgtown over the M6 Toll and A5, with the nearest station at Cannock. A proposal for a new station serving Bridgtown and Churchbridge was withdrawn in 2005 due to lack of funding. Bridgtown is served by frequent bus services to Cannock, Birmingham, Great Wyrley and Walsall.

References

Cannock Chase District
Villages in Staffordshire
Civil parishes in Staffordshire